Guraleus semicarinatus is a species of sea snail, a marine gastropod mollusk in the family Mangeliidae.

Description
The length of the shell attains 7 mm, its diameter 2.7 mm.

(Original description) The rather thin, fusiform-turreted shell has a white color with some brown stains below the suture and a brown spot at the middle of the lip-varix. The sculpture consists of many slightly oblique and arcuate longitudinal riblets about as wide as their intervals, and sixteen in number on the body whorl. These are crossed by spaced spiral threads, about 18 from the shoulder down on the body whorl, a little widened where they pass over the riblets. The spaces between the threads and above the shoulder are very finely striate spirally. The shell contains 7 whorls, the first 1½ rounded, radially weakly costulate, several whorls following convex, rounded, the last 2 or 3 whorls angular at the shoulder. The body whorl bears a narrow, elevated, arcuate lip-varix. The aperture is narrow, Both.lips are slightly arcuate; blunt at the ends, smooth within. The anal sinus is rather deep and rounded, the varix curving back of it.

Distribution
This marine species occurs off Japan.

References

External links
  Tucker, J.K. 2004 Catalog of recent and fossil turrids (Mollusca: Gastropoda). Zootaxa 682:1–1295.
 

semicarinatus
Gastropods described in 1904